Blizzards is the fifth studio album by English electronic musician Nathan Fake. It was released on 3 April 2020 through Cambria Instruments.

The first single from the album, "Tbilisi" was released on 12 February 2020.

Critical reception

Blizzards was met with generally favourable reviews from critics. At Metacritic, which assigns a weighted average rating out of 100 to reviews from mainstream publications, this release received an average score of 79, based on 4 reviews. Paul Simpson of AllMusic stated that the album is Fake's "strongest album" so far, and that it plays "like the soundtrack to an end-of-days rave".

Track listing

References

2020 albums